Bérengeville-la-Campagne is a commune in the Eure department and Normandy region in north-western France.

Population

See also
Communes of the Eure department

References

Communes of Eure